Hans Jacob Carstensen (born 17 October 1965) is a Danish businessperson.

He has a cand.oecon. degree from the Aarhus University in 1989, and attended INSEAD from 2002 to 2004. He was a senior vice president in TeleDanmark and chief financial officer in Telenordia before becoming CFO of Egmont in 2002. He is also the vicechair of TV 2.

References

1965 births
Living people
Danish business executives
Aarhus University alumni
Chief financial officers